Taeniolabis ("banded incisor") is a genus of extinct multituberculate mammal from the Paleocene of North America.

Description
 
 
It is the largest known member of the extinct order Multituberculata, as well as the largest non-therian mammal: T. taoensis, a species known from Danian deposits in the Denver Formation of Colorado, possibly exceeds 100 kg.

Taxonomy
It is within the suborder of Cimolodonta and is a member of the superfamily Taeniolabidoidea. The genus was named by Edward Drinker Cope in 1882. Species have also been placed with the genera Catopsalis and Polymastodon.

The species Taeniolabis lamberti was named by N.B. Simmons in 1987. It has been found in the Puercan (Paleocene)-age Tullock Formation of Montana. It is not quite as large as T. taoensis, but still a hefty size for a multituberculate.

The species Taeniolabis taoensis was named by Cope E.D. in 1882. It is also known as Catopsalis pollux (Cope, 1882); Polymastodon attenuatus (Cope, 1885); P. latimolis Cope, 1885; P. selenodus Osborn H.F. and Earle C., 1895; P. taoensis (Cope, 1882); T. attetuatus; T. scalper (Cope 1884); T. sulcatus (Cope 1882a); T. triserialis (Granger & Simpson, 1929). They are found in the Puercan-age Nacimiento Formation of New Mexico and in the Ravenscrag Formation of Saskatchewan. It is the largest known multituberculate, as big as the giant beaver.

References

Sources
 Cope (1882), "A new genus of Taeniodonta". American Naturalist XVI, p. 604-605.
 Osborn and Earle (1895), "Fossil mammals of the Puerco beds." Collection of 1892. Bull. Amer. Mus. Nat. Hist. VII, p. 1-70, with 21 figs.
 Granger and Simpson (1929), "A revision of the Tertiary Multituberculata." Bulletin Amer. Mus. Nat. Hist. 56, p. 601-676, 43 figs.
 Simons N.B. (1986), "Taeniolabis Cope, 1882 (Mammalia, Multituberculata): proposed designation of Polymastodon taoensis Cope, 1882 as type species." Bulletin of Zoological Nomenclature 43(3), p. 310-311.
 Kielan-Jaworowska Z. and Hurum J.H. (2001), "Phylogeny and Systematics of multituberculate mammals". Paleontology 44, p. 389-429.
 Cope (1882), "Mammalia in the Laramie Formation'." American Naturalist 16, p. 830-831.
 Much of this information is derived from  MESOZOIC MAMMALS; Eucosmodontidae, Microcosmodontidae and Taeniolabidoidea, an Internet directory.
 Simmons (1987), "A revision of Taeniolabis(Mammalia: Multituberculata), with a new species from the Puercan of eastern Montana." J. Paleont. 61(4), p. 794-808.
 

Cimolodonts
Paleocene mammals of North America
Paleocene genus extinctions
Prehistoric mammal genera